In Greek mythology, Agrius (Ancient Greek: ἌγριοςAgrios means 'wild, savage') and Oreius were the twin sons of Polyphonte, daughter of Hipponous, and a bear.

Mythology 
Polyphonte was punished by Aphrodite for the former did not worship her, instead becoming a devotee of the virgin goddess Artemis. The goddess of love made her to couple with a bear which resulted to her twin savage children, Agrius and Orius.'She [i.e Polyphonte] brought forth two children, Agrius and Orius, huge and of immense strength. They honoured neither god nor man but scorned them all. If they met a stranger they would haul him home to eat, Zeus loathed them and sent Hermes to punish them in whatever way he chose. Hermes decided to chop off their hands and feet. But Ares, since the family of Polyphonte descended from him, snatched her sons from this fate. With the help of Hermes he changed them into birds. Polyphonte became a small owl whose voice is heard at night. She does not eat or drink and keeps her head turned down and the tips of her feet turned up. She is a portent of war and sedition for mankind. Orius became an eagle owl, a bird that presages little good to anyone when it appears. Agrius was changed into a vulture, the bird most detested by gods and men. These gods gave him an utter craving for human flesh and blood. Their female servant was changed into a woodpecker. As she was changing her shape she prayed to the gods not to become a bird evil for mankind. Hermes and Ares heard her prayer because she had by necessity done what her masters had ordered. This is a bird of good omen for someone going hunting or to feasts.'

In popular culture
In Rick Riordan's novel The Sea of Monsters, Agrius and Orieus act as henchmen to the main antagonist Luke Castellan. In the final battle, they are killed by Blackjack the pegasus and a centaur respectively. In the film adaptation they were replaced by a manticore.

Notes

References 

 Antoninus Liberalis, The Metamorphoses of Antoninus Liberalis translated by Francis Celoria (Routledge 1992). Online version at the Topos Text Project.
Graves, Robert, The Greek Myths, Harmondsworth, London, England, Penguin Books, 1960. 
Graves, Robert, The Greek Myths: The Complete and Definitive Edition. Penguin Books Limited. 2017. 

Deeds of Zeus
Deeds of Hermes
Deeds of Ares
Metamorphoses into birds in Greek mythology